The Battle of the Tanais River in 373 AD between the Huns and the Alans, was fought on the traditional border between Asia and Europe. The Huns were victorious.

Some historians credit this battle as the beginning of the process of Germanic migration, in which the Huns pushed Germanic tribes into central and northern Europe, resulting in many conflicts between those tribes and the Roman Empire.

It was followed by a joint Hun-Alan invasion of the Gothic kingdom of Ermanaric.

See also
 Germanic migrations

Sources 

 Spencer C. Tucker - A Global Chronology of Conflict: From the Ancient World to the Modern Middle East [6 volumes]: From the Ancient World to the Modern Middle East - 2777 pages -  - p. 162
 John Keegan - A History of Warfare  - 1994 - 432 pages -   - page 184
 Otto Maenchen-Helfen, Otto Helfen «The World of the Huns: Studies in Their History and Culture»

Literature 

 The 'evil' mind: Pt. 2: Combat motivation and war atrocities by Johan M.G. van der Dennen
 William Rosen - Justinian's Flea: Plague, Empire, and the Birth of Europe - 2007 - Viking - 367 pages -  - page 42

Tanais
Tanais River
Tanais River
373
History of Rostov Oblast